The Treason Act 1423 (2 Hen.6 c.17) was an Act of the Parliament of England. It made it high treason for a person who had been indicted for treason to escape from prison (whether they were guilty of the original allegation of treason or not). This form of treason was abolished by the Treason Act 1547, although the Act was formally repealed in 1863.

See also
Escape of Traitors Act 1572
High treason in the United Kingdom

References

Treason in England
Acts of the Parliament of England
1420s in law
1423 in England